A list of films produced by the Bollywood film industry based in Mumbai in 1964:

Top-grossing films
The ten top-grossing films at the Indian Box Office in 1964:

A-G

H-K

L-Q

R-S

T-Z

References

External links
 Bollywood films of 1964 at the Internet Movie Database
 Indian Film Songs from the Year 1964 - A look back at 1964 with a special focus on Hindi film songs

1964
Bollywood
Films, Bollywood